Idledale is an unincorporated town, a post office, and a census-designated place (CDP) located in and governed by Jefferson County, Colorado, United States. The CDP is a part of the Denver–Aurora–Lakewood, CO Metropolitan Statistical Area. The Idledale post office has the ZIP code 80453. At the United States Census 2020, the population of the Idledale CDP was 214.

History
Originally called "Starbuck Heights", the town was almost washed out by a storm in 1933. When it was rebuilt, the town became known as Idledale.

Geography
Idledale is located on the north side of Bear Creek. Colorado State Highway 74 passes through the community as it traverses Bear Creek Canyon; to the east, the highway is known as Bear Creek Canyon Scenic Mountain Drive and leads downstream  to Morrison; to the west the highway leads up the canyon the same distance to Kittredge.

Demographics

Education
Idledale is served by the Jefferson County Public Schools.

See also

Outline of Colorado
Index of Colorado-related articles
State of Colorado
Colorado cities and towns
Colorado census designated places
Colorado counties
Jefferson County, Colorado
Colorado metropolitan areas
Front Range Urban Corridor
North Central Colorado Urban Area
Denver-Aurora-Boulder, CO Combined Statistical Area
Denver-Aurora-Broomfield, CO Metropolitan Statistical Area

References

External links

Idledale @ Colorado.com
Idledale @ UncoverColorado.com
Idledale, Colorado Mining Claims And Mines
Jefferson County website
Jeffco Public Schools

Census-designated places in Jefferson County, Colorado
Census-designated places in Colorado
Denver metropolitan area